Daniel Andrey Hernandes (born April 16, 1979 in São Paulo) is a male judoka from Brazil. He won the gold medal in the heavyweight division (+ 100 kg) at the 2003 Pan American Games. In the final, he defeated Haiti's Joel Brutus. He represented his native country at two consecutive Summer Olympics (2000 and 2004).

References

  Profile

External links
 
 

 Facebook

1979 births
Living people
Judoka at the 2000 Summer Olympics
Judoka at the 2004 Summer Olympics
Judoka at the 1999 Pan American Games
Judoka at the 2003 Pan American Games
Olympic judoka of Brazil
Sportspeople from São Paulo
Brazilian male judoka
Pan American Games gold medalists for Brazil
Pan American Games silver medalists for Brazil
Pan American Games medalists in judo
South American Games gold medalists for Brazil
South American Games medalists in judo
Competitors at the 2002 South American Games
Medalists at the 1999 Pan American Games
Medalists at the 2003 Pan American Games
20th-century Brazilian people
21st-century Brazilian people